A misyar marriage ( or more often  zawaj al-misyar "traveller's marriage") is a type of marriage contract allowed by some Sunni Muslims. The husband and wife thus joined are able to renounce some marital rights such as living together, the wife's rights to housing and maintenance money (nafaqa), and the husband's right to home-keeping and access. The practice is often used in some Islamic countries to give a legal recognition to behavior that might otherwise be considered adulterous via temporary, contractual marriages.

In practice 
The Sheikh of al-Azhar mosque, Muhammad Sayyid Tantawi and theologian Yusuf Al-Qaradawi note in their writings and in their lectures that a major proportion of the few men who take a spouse in the framework of the misyar marriage are men who are married or women who are either divorced, widowed or beyond the customary marriage age. Arab News reported in 2014 that the “misyar marriages became a widespread reality” in the Saudi kingdom.

Legality
Misyar marriage fits within the general rules of marriage in law, on condition merely that it fulfill all the requirements of the Shariah marriage contract, i.e.:
 The agreement of both parties
 Two legal witnesses (shahidain)
 The payment by the husband to his wife of mahr (dower) in the amount that is agreed
 The absence of a fixed time period for the contract
 Any particular stipulations (shuroot) which the two parties agree to include in the contract and which are in conformity with Muslim marriage law

However, some Sunni scholars and organizations have opposed the concept of Nikah Misyar altogether.

In the view of the Saudi Islamic lawyer and member of the Higher Council of Ulema of Saudi Arabia Abdullah bin Sulaiman bin Menie, the wife can, at any time as she sees fit, retract her renunciation of her financial rights and require of her husband that he give her all of her marital rights, including that he live with her and provide for her financial needs (nafaqa). The husband can then either do so, or grant her a divorce.

For these reasons, Professor Yusuf Al-Qaradawi observes that he does not promote this type of marriage, although he has to recognise that it is legal, since it fulfills all the requirements of the usual marriage contract. He states his preference that the clause of renunciation be not included within the marriage contract, but be the subject of a simple verbal agreement between the parties. He underlines the fact that Muslims are held by their commitments, whether they are written or verbal.

Criticism
Misyar has been suggested by some authors to be a comparable marriage (temporary marriage) and that they find it for the sole purpose of "sexual gratification in a licit manner".
According to Karen Ruffle, assistant professor of religion at the University of Toronto, even though mutʿah is prohibited by Sunni schools of law, several types of impermanent marriage exist, including misyar (ambulant) marriage and ʿurfi (customary) marriage, which gained popularity in parts of the Sunni world. 
According to Florian Pohl, assistant professor of religion at Emory University's Oxford College, misyar marriage is a controversial issue in the Muslim world, as many see it as a practice that encourages marriages for purely sexual purposes, or that it is used as a cover for a form of prostitution.
Islamic scholars like Ibn Uthaimeen or Al-Albani claim, for their part, that misyar marriage may be legal but not moral. They agree that the wife can reclaim the rights which she gave up at the time of contract at any time. But, they are opposed to this type of marriage on the grounds that it contradicts the spirit of the Islamic law of marriage and that it has perverse effects on the woman, the family, and the community in general. Some ulama (scholars) have issued fatwas (legal opinions) in which they contend that misyar is zina (fornication). For Al-Albani, misyar marriage may even be considered as illicit, because it runs counter to the objectives and the spirit of marriage in Islam.

Al-Albani also underlines the social problems which can result from the misyar marriage, particularly in the event that children are born from this union. The children raised by their mother in a home from which the father is always absent without reason may suffer difficulties.

Salafi leader, Ibn Baaz was asked about misyar marriage with the intention of divorce. He replied that it is permissible and, along with Permanent Council (of Muftis), decreed that it is permissible. "Someone asked him: In one of your tapes, you have a fatwa that it is permissible for someone in a Western country to get married with the intention of getting divorced after a specific period. What is the difference between this and between Mut'ah?Response: Yes, this fatwa has come from Permanent Council (of Muftis), and I am its leader, and we have ruled that it is permissible to marry with the intention of getting divorced, if this intention is between the servant and his Lord. If someone marries in a Western country, and his intention is that when he finishes his studies or finds a job or something like this that he will get divorced, then there is absolutely no problem with this in the opinion of all 'ulama. This intention is something between the servant and Allah, and is not a condition. The difference between this and Mut'ah is that Mut'ah has the condition of a definite time period, such as a month or two months or a year or two years and so forth. If the time period fends, then the Nikah is abrogated. This is the invalid form Mut'ah. However, if somebody marries according to the Sunnah of the Prophet, but he nonetheless holds the intention in his heart that when he leaves the (Western) country he will divorce, then there is no harm it. This intention might change, and so it is not something definite. This intention is not a condition, and it is something between the servant and his Lord. There is no harm in it, and it is one of the ways that a person may remain chaste and avoid fornication and debauchery. This is the statement of all people of knowledge."
Ibn Baaz was also asked:"this kind of marriage is where the man marries a second, third or fourth wife, and the wife is in a situation that compels her to stay with her parents or one of them in her own house, and the husband goes to her at various times depending on the circumstances of both. What is the Islamic ruling on this type of marriage?"He replied:

"There is nothing wrong with that if the marriage contract fulfills all the conditions set out by sharee’ah, which is the presence of the wali and the consent of both partners, and the presence of two witnesses of good character to the drawing up of the contract, and both partners being free of any impediments, because of the general meaning of the words of the Prophet (peace and blessings of Allaah be upon him): 'The conditions that are most deserving of being fulfilled are those by means of which intimacy becomes permissible for you' and 'The Muslims are bound by their conditions.' If the partners agree that the woman will stay with her family or that her share of the husband's time will be during the day and not during the night, or on certain days or certain nights, there is nothing wrong with that, so long as the marriage is announced and not hidden."

However, some students of Ibn Baaz said that he later retracted the view that it is permissible, but no writings have been found to prove that.

Earlier ulama (scholars) also noted consensus upon misyar marriage with the intention of divorce. Al-Nawawi wrote:"Qazi said: ‘There is an unanimous agreement that whoever performs permanent marriage but his intent is to stay with her for a specific period, verily his marriage is valid, and it is not Mut’ah marriage, because Mut’ah marriage is based on a conditional period."

'Abd al-'Azeez Aal al-Shaykh was asked:

"There is a lot of talk about misyaar marriage being haraam or halaal. We would like a definitive statement about this matter from you, with a description of its conditions and obligations, if it is permissible."

He replied:

"The conditions of marriage are that the two partners should be identified and give their consent, and there should be a wali (guardian) and two witnesses. If the conditions are met and the marriage is announced, and they do not agree to conceal it, either the husband, the wife or their guardians, and he offered a waleemah or wedding feast, then this marriage is valid, and you can call it whatever you want after that."

Shaykh al-Albani was asked about misyar marriage and he forbade it for two reasons:

 That the purpose of marriage is repose as Allah says (interpretation of the meaning): "And among His Signs is this, that He created for you wives from among yourselves, that you may find repose in them, and He has put between you affection and mercy. Verily, in that are indeed signs for a people who reflect" [al-Room 30:21]. But this is not achieved in this kind of marriage. 
 It may be decreed that the husband has children with this woman, but because he is far away from her and rarely comes to her, that will be negatively reflected in his children's upbringing and attitude.

See also
 Islamic marital jurisprudence
 Living apart together
 Nikah 'urfi
 Nikah Mut'ah
 Pilegesh
 Walking marriage

References

External links

English
 Al-Qaradawi, Yusuf: Misyar marriage
 Al-Qaradawi, Yusuf: Mut’ah marriage
 Al-Qaradawi, Yusuf: The philosophy of marriage in Islam
 Kutty : Conditions of valid marriage
 Siddiqi : Witnesses and mahr (dower) for marriage
 Al-Qasim : Temporary marriage (mut'ah)
 Urfi marriage
 Yet another marriage without strings, Fatwa committee of Al-Azhar against Misyar
 Misyar marriage at lexicorient.com
 Misyar marriage at marriage.about.com
 Misyar marriages
 Misyar marriage – a marvel or misery?
 Misyar offers marriage-lite in strict Saudi society
 Al-Hakeem, Mariam: Misyar marriage gaining prominence among Saudis
 No strings attached marriage enrages Gulf women
 Marriage or mockery?
 Al-Obeikan, Sheikh Abdul Mohsen, vice-minister of Justice of Saudi Arabia: interview with the Arabic daily "Asharq al-Awsat" of 09/07/06 in which he discusses the legal value of the IFA fatwa
 Khalid Chraibi: "Misyar" marriage

Arabic
 Al-Marzuqi Saleh Secretary General of IFA, interviewed by TV Alarabiya.net on the subject of the IFA decisions on 12/04/2006
 An-Najimi, Muhammad: member of IFA, interviewed by TV AlArabiya.net on the subject of the IFA decisions on (28/04/06)
 Sharia ruling 
 BinBaz: Mesyar marriage and its conditions

Marriage in Islam
Temporary marriages
Islamic terminology